Sachin Badadhe (born in India) is an Indian football manager.

Career

While playing for Sky Hawks, Badadhe took charge of training sessions when the head coach was unavailable. However, he eventually stopped playing to take care of his tea shop and family. On the advice of his wife, Badadhe returned to football in the form of coaching, and was assistant of Punjab when they won the I-League in 2017/18.

References

Indian footballers
Footballers from Maharashtra
Living people
Association football defenders
Indian football managers
Year of birth missing (living people)
RoundGlass Punjab FC managers